Pont de la Margineda  is a bridge located in Santa Coloma, Andorra la Vella Parish, Andorra. It is a heritage property registered in the Cultural Heritage of Andorra. It was built in the 14-15th century. The bridge spans a river called the Gran Valira. The archstones are pumice, to keep the structure light. The walls are made of granite.

See also
La Margineda

References

External links

Buildings and structures in Andorra la Vella
Bridges in Andorra
Cultural Heritage of Andorra